Charles Buchan may refer to:

 Charlie Buchan (1891–1960), English football player and writer
 Charles Forbes Buchan (1869–1954), British Army officer